IPMI International Business School (formerly Indonesia Institute for Management Development) is a business school located in Jl. Rawajati Timur I/1, Kalibata, South of Jakarta, Indonesia. It offers both bachelor's and master's degrees in business administration, along with some other business programs available, all delivered in English. Starting from 2012, IPMI International Business School is also focusing on business research to improve business in Indonesia.

History
IPMI International Business School, established in 1984 in Indonesia has been known as a leading business school in preparing senior executives for international markets.

The annual joint Advanced Management Program organized in co-operation between IPMI International Business School, Católica Lisbon Business School (Portugal), and Kellogg Business School (USA), running in Jakarta, Lisbon (Portugal), and Chicago (USA), as well as the senior executive education programs with other top universities have proven that IPMI International Business School’s high quality education meets the international standards.

IPMI International Business School has signed the MOU (Memorandum of Understanding) for double degree partnership with the following universities: Oulu Business School in Finland (AACSB accredited); Melbourne Business School in Australia (AACSB accredited and MBA program EQUIS accredited); Burgundy School of Business in Dijon, France (AACSB accredited), Audencia Nantes School of Management in France (EQUIS, AACSB and AMBA accredited); and ENPC School of International Management in Paris, France (AMBA accredited).

IPMI International Business School is a member of key international business school associations; the Association to Advance Collegiate Schools of Business (AACSB) and The Association of MBAs (AMBA).

History 
Indonesia Institute for Management Development (IPMI) was founded in 1984 by Bustanil Arifin with the assistance of some faculty members from the Harvard Business School and the Ivey Business School. Initially, the IPMI offered only a master's degree as its program. In 2003, IPMI offers a Bachelor of Business Administration degree for undergraduates. In 2012, IPMI goes International and changes its name to IPMI International Business School with the motto: Inspiring, Pioneering, Mindshaping, and Impacting.

List of IPMI Presidents:
 Dr. Siswanto Sudoma (1984–1991)
 Ir. Sjoufjan Awal, MM, MSEE, PE. (1991–1994)
 Prof. Dr. Wangiono Ismangil (1994–1999)
 Prof. Dr. Nirwan Idrus (1999–2003)
 Anh Dung, Do, MBA (2003–2004)
 Niclas Adler, PhD, Professor (2012–2014)
 Jimmy M Rifai Gani, MPA (2014–2019)
Prof. Aman Wirakartakusumah, MSc, PhD (2019 -

Academics 
IPMI International Business School offers all undergraduates the Bachelor of Management (BM) degree, while the graduates are offered with Master of Management (MM) degree. Besides the other programs mentioned, there are also other programs such as Executive MM for the post graduates, Certified Management Accountant (CMA) preparatory program, and in-house programs including Management development program and Professional Development Program. All programs mentioned are using Harvard case studies as one of the learning methods. Exchange program is also available for those who desire to study abroad.

Programs 
 Bachelor of Business Administration (BBA Program)
BBA Professional Class
 Master of  Business Administration (MBA Program)
 Executive MBA
 Certified Management Accountant (CMA) Preparatory Program
 In-House Programs
 Management Development Program
 Professional Development Program

References

External links 
 
 http://www.learn4good.com/schools/indonesia-jakarta-business-courses1.htm
 https://web.archive.org/web/20130518191824/http://goodmbaguide.com/ipmi-business-school-profile/
 http://www.eduniversal-ranking.com/business-school-university-ranking-in-indonesia.html

Business schools in Indonesia